Iran participated in the 1986 Asian Games held in the capital city of Seoul. This country is ranked 4th with 6 gold medals in this edition of the Asiad.

Medal summary

Medal table

Medalists

Results by event

Aquatics

Water polo

Men

Athletics

Men

 Mohammad Ali Mohammadi
 Abdolsaheb Khoshikaran

Cycling

Men

 Ezzatollah Mazaheri
 Saeid Zareeian
 Siamak Safarzadeh
 Mehrdad Safarzadeh
 Abolghasem Rahmanian
 Mohammad Reza Bajoul

Football

Men

Handball

Men

Judo

Men

 Jahangir Ghourkhanji
 Mehdi Seilpour
 Azim Ganji

Taekwondo

Men

Weightlifting

Men

Wrestling

Men's freestyle

Men's Greco-Roman

References

  Iran Olympic Committee - Asian Games Medalists
  Iran National Sports Organization - Asian Games Medalists

Nations at the 1986 Asian Games
1986
Asian Games